André Wilhelm (born 7 February 1943) is a French former racing cyclist. His sporting career began with VC Metz. He finished in last place in the 1969 Tour de France.

References

External links
 

1943 births
Living people
French male cyclists
Sportspeople from Moselle (department)
Cyclo-cross cyclists
Cyclists from Grand Est